Borgioli is an Italian surname. Notable people with the surname include:

 Armando Borgioli (1898–1945), Italian operatic baritone
 Dino Borgioli (1891–1960), Italian lyric tenor
 Billy Borgioli (died 2015), guitarist for the band The Real Kids

Italian-language surnames